Andasibe is a town and commune in Madagascar. It belongs to the district of Mananara Nord, which is a part of the region of Analanjirofo. The population of the commune was estimated to be approximately 7,960 in 2018.

Agriculture
Cloves and vanilla are produced in Andasibe.

References and notes 

Populated places in Analanjirofo